Osteoglossoidei are a suborder of the order Osteoglossiformes (Latin: "bony tongues") that contains the butterflyfish, the arowanas and bonytongues, as well as extinct families.

References

Osteoglossiformes